Vences's chameleon (Calumma vencesi) is a species of lizard in the family Chamaeleonidae. The species is endemic to Madagascar.

Etymology
The specific name, vencesi, is in honor of German herpetologist Miguel Vences.

Geographic range and habitat
The geographic range of Vences' chameleon is not well understood; it is thought that the total area is around 591 square kilometers (228 square miles). What is certain is that specimens have been collected from several forests in the northeastern corner of Madagascar.

Reproduction
C. vencesi is oviparous.

Conservation and threats
The main threat to Vences' chameleon is habitat loss and degradation. While having a sizable range, the species is extremely intolerant of damaged habitat. Also, it has not been recorded in any protected areas, making it all the more vulnerable to logging and slash and burn agriculture. Fortunately, the illegal trade of this species seems to be virtually nonexistent.

References

Further reading
Andreone, Franco; Mattioli, Fabio; Jesu, Riccardo; Randrianirina, Jasmin E. (2001). "Two new chameleons of the genus Calumma from north-east Madagascar, with observations on hemipenial morphology in the Calumma furcifer group (Reptilia, Squamata, Chamaeleonidae)". Herpetological Journal 11 (2): 53-68. (Calumma vencesi, new species).
Glaw F (2015). "Taxonomic checklist of chameleons (Squamata: Chamaeleonidae)". Vertebrate Zoology 65 (2): 167–246.
Glaw F, Vences M (2006). A Field Guide to the Amphibians and Reptiles of Madagascar, Third Edition. Cologne, Germany: Vences & Glaw Verlag. 496 pp. .

Calumma
Endemic fauna of Madagascar
Reptiles described in 2001